Jakeb Sullivan (born July 1, 1994) is an American football quarterback for the Frankfurt Galaxy in the European League of Football. He played college football for the South Dakota Mines Hardrockers, a Division II program in Rapid City, South Dakota.

Early life and college career
Sullivan attended St. Thomas More High School in Rapid City, South Dakota, where he played quarterback for the football team. He was team captain and team MVP, and was named to the All-State and Academic All-State teams.

Sullivan joined the South Dakota Mines Hardrockers program in NCAA Division II, where he became the starting quarterback. In his four years at SDSM&T he set 17 new school records, 2 All-RMCS best quarterback and Don Hansen All-American Team. With 325.1 yards per game, he led the entire NCAA Division II. In total he completed 293 passes for 3,576 yards, 32 passing touchdowns and 10 rushing touchdowns.

College statistics

Professional career

German Football League
In December 2018, Sullivan signed with the Marburg Mercenaries ahead of the 2019 German Football League season. In his first year as an import player he reached several milestones. After nine victories out of 14 games his team qualified for the play-offs, where they lost in the quarterfinals against the Dresden Monarchs. He was nominated in the GFL Allstar Team as the statistical passing leader of this season. He threw for 46 passing touchdowns and ran for 14 rushing touchdowns. In October 2019 he was signed by the Vienna Vikings in the Austrian Football League. He did not start due to the COVID-19 pandemic.

European League of Football
In the inaugural 2021 European League of Football season Sullivan was signed by the Frankfurt Galaxy and head coach Thomas Kösling. In the regular season Sullivan had the highest passing completion rate (66,2 %) of the league as well as 2,037 passing yards and 23 touchdowns. With a passer rating of 105.96 he was the second best quarterback in the regular season. In the Divisional Championship playoff-game against the Cologne Centurions he scored five passing touchdowns with four different target and was nominated MVP of this game. In the first ELF Championship game the Frankfurt Galaxy won against the Hamburg Sea Devils with a dramatic 32:30 score. He was nominated ELF Championship game-MVP, voted to the ELF Allstar game and won the Offensive Player of the Year award. The Frankfurt Galaxy announced in mid November the extension for another season.

Professional statistics

Private life
Sullivan has four younger siblings and is of Native American descent of the Cheyenne River Reservation. His father was football coach at St. Thomas More High School. He majored in industrial engineering and was nominated for the Allstate AFCA Good Works Team.

References

External links
 South Dakota Mines Hardrockers bio
 ELF bio

1994 births
Living people
American football quarterbacks
Players of American football from South Dakota
Frankfurt Galaxy (ELF) players
German Football League players
Sportspeople from Rapid City, South Dakota
American expatriate players of American football
American expatriate sportspeople in Germany
South Dakota Mines Hardrockers football